Wufeng Tujia Autonomous County, formerly Changle County (Changlo County ), is a county in the west of Hubei province, People's Republic of China, bordering Hunan province to the south. It is under the administration of the prefecture-level city of Yichang. It is twinned with Westfield, Massachusetts, United States.

Administrative divisions
Five towns:
Wufeng, Changleping, Yuyangguan, Renheping, Wantan

Three townships:
Fujiayan Township, Niuzhuang Township, Caihua Township

Climate

References

Counties of Hubei
Geography of Yichang
Tujia autonomous counties